The Filmfare Award for Best Supporting Actor is given by Filmfare as part of its annual Filmfare Awards for Hindi films, to recognise a male actor who has delivered an outstanding performance in a supporting role. Although the awards started in 1954, awards for the best supporting actor category started only the following year 1955. As of 2016, Pran, Amrish Puri, Amitabh Bachchan, Abhishek Bachchan and Anil Kapoor lead the list, with three wins each. Vivek Oberoi (Company, 2003) currently also holds the record of being the youngest recipient of the award, whereas Rishi Kapoor holds the record for being the eldest (Kapoor & Sons, 2017), while Abhishek Bachchan holds the record for winning the award thrice consecutively (2005, 2006 & 2007).

Superlatives

Multiple Nominees
 9 Nominations : Pran
 8 Nominations : Amrish Puri, Amitabh Bachchan, Naseeruddin Shah
 7 Nominations : Anupam Kher
 6 Nominations : Mehmood, Jackie Shroff, Abhishek Bachchan, Pankaj Tripathi⁣
 5 Nominations : Raaj Kumar, Ashok Kumar, Amjad Khan, Om Puri, Anil Kapoor, Nana Patekar

Multiple Winners

 3 Awards: Pran, Amrish Puri, Amitabh Bachchan, Abhishek Bachchan, Anil Kapoor
 2 Awards: Saif Ali Khan, Motilal, Nana Palsikar, Raaj Kumar, Amjad Khan, Danny Denzongpa, Jackie Shroff

List of winners

1950s

1960s

1970s

 1970 Pran – Aansoo Ban Gaye Phool as Shambhu Mahadev Rao
 Ashok Kumar – Aashirwad as Shivnath 'Joggi Thakur' Choudhary
 Balraj Sahni – Ek Phool Do Mali as Kailash Nath Kaushal
 1971 Feroz Khan – Aadmi Aur Insaan as Jai Kishan / J.K.
 Feroz Khan – Safar as Shekhar Kapoor
 Prem Chopra – Himmat as Boss
 1972 Amitabh Bachchan – Anand as Dr. Bhaskar K. Bannerjee
 Pran – Adhikar as Shikari Banhe Khan Bhopali
 Shatrughan Sinha – Paras as Thakur Arjun Singh
 1973 Pran – Be-Imaan as Ram Singh
 Prem Nath – Shor as Khan Badshah
 1974 Amitabh Bachchan – Namak Haraam as Vikram 'Vicky' Maharaj
 Ashok Kumar – Victoria No. 203 as Raja
 Asrani – Abhimaan as Chandru Kriplani
 Pran – Zanjeer as Sher Khan
 Prem Nath – Bobby as Jack Braganza
 1975 Vinod Khanna – Haath Ki Safai as Shankar Kumar
 Feroz Khan – International Crook as SP Rajesh
 Prem Nath – Amir Garib as Daulatram
 Prem Nath – Roti Kapda Aur Makaan as Harnam Singh
 Shatrughan Sinha – Dost as Gopichand 'Gopi' Sharma
 1976 Shashi Kapoor – Deewaar as Ravi Verma
 Amjad Khan – Sholay as Gabbar Singh
 Pran – Do Jhoot as Chaudhary Pratap Rai
 Pran – Majboor as Michael D'Souza
 Utpal Dutt – Amanush as Maheem Ghoshal
 1977 Prem Chopra – Do Anjaane as Ronjit Malik 
 Ashok Kumar – Chhoti Si Baat as Julius Nagendranath Wilfred Singh
 Prem Chopra – Mehbooba as Appa
 Shashi Kapoor – Kabhi Kabhie as Vijay Khanna
 Vinod Khanna – Hera Pheri as Ajay Pirachand
 1978 Shriram Lagoo – Gharaonda as Mr. Modi
 Shriram Lagoo – Kinara as Architect
 Tariq – Hum Kisise Kum Naheen as Sanjay Kumar
 Vikram – Aadmi Sadak Ka as Chandramohan 'Chander' U. Nath
 Vinod Mehra – Anurodh as Shrikanth Mathur
 1979 Saeed Jaffrey – Shatranj Ke Khilari as Mir Roshan Ali
 Danny Denzongpa – Devata as Inspector Lawrence
 Randhir Kapoor – Kasme Vaade as Raju
 Sanjeev Kumar – Trishul as Raj Kumar Gupta
 Vinod Khanna – Muqaddar Ka Sikandar as Vishal Anand

1980s

 1980 Amjad Khan – Dada as Fazlu
 Naseeruddin Shah – Junoon as Sarfaraz Khan
 Shatrughan Sinha – Kaala Patthar as Mangal Singh
 Utpal Dutt – Gol Maal as Bhavani Shankar
 Vinod Mehra – Amar Deep as Kishan
 1981 Om Puri – Aakrosh as Bhiku Lahanya
 Amjad Khan – Qurbani as Inspector Amjad Khan
 Girish Karnad – Aasha as Deepak
 Raj Kapoor – Abdullah as Abdullah
 Shriram Lagoo – Insaf Ka Tarazu as Mr. Chandra
 1982 Amjad Khan – Yaarana as Bishan
 Amjad Khan – Love Story as Havaldar Sher Singh
 Rakesh Roshan – Dhanwan as Anil
 Saeed Jaffrey – Chashme Buddoor as Lalan Mian
 Suresh Oberoi – Lawaaris as Ram Singh
 1983 Shammi Kapoor – Vidhaata as Gurbaksh
 Girish Karnad – Teri Kasam as Rakesh
 Sanjeev Kumar – Vidhaata as Abu Baba
 Shashi Kapoor – Namak Halaal as Raja
 Vinod Mehra – Bemisal as Dr. Prashant Chaturvedi
 1984 Sadashiv Amrapurkar – Ardh Satya as Rama Shetty
Amitabh Bachchan – Andha Kanoon as Jan Nissar Akhtar Khan
 Naseeruddin Shah – Katha as Rajaram Purshottam Joshi
 Naseeruddin Shah – Mandi as Tungrus
 Raj Babbar – Agar Tum Na Hote as Raj Bedi
 1985 Anil Kapoor – Mashaal as Raja
 Danny Denzongpa – Kanoon Kya Karega as Raghuvir Singh
 Nikhil Bhagat – Hip Hip Hurray as Raghu
 Shafi Inamdar – Aaj Ki Awaaz as Inspector Shafi
 Suresh Oberoi – Ghar Ek Mandir as Rahim
 1986 Amrish Puri – Meri Jung as G.D. Thakral
 Anupam Kher – Janam as Virendra
 Kamal Haasan – Saagar as Raja
 Kulbhushan Kharbanda – Ghulami as Havaldar Gopi Dada
 Saeed Jaffrey – Ram Teri Ganga Maili as Kunj Bihari
 Utpal Dutt – Saaheb as Badri Prasad Sharma
 1987 – No award
 1988 – No award
 1989 Anupam Kher – Vijay as Lala Yodhraj Bhalla
 Chunky Pandey – Tezaab as Baban
 Nana Patekar – Andha Yudh as S.P. Suhas Dandekar

1990s

 1990 Nana Patekar – Parinda as Anna
 Amrish Puri – Tridev as Bhairav Singh
 Mohsin Khan – Batwara as Thakur Rajendra Singh
 Pankaj Kapur – Raakh as Inspector P.K
 Vinod Khanna – Chandni as Lalit Khanna
 1991 Mithun Chakraborty – Agneepath as Krishnan Iyer M.A.
 Anupam Kher – Dil as Hazari Prasad
 Om Puri – Ghayal as Joe D'Souza
 Rami Reddy – Pratibandh as Gangster
 1992 Danny Denzongpa – Sanam Bewafa as Sher Khan
 Amrish Puri – Phool Aur Kaante as Nageshwar
 Anupam Kher – Lamhe as Prem Anand
 Anupam Kher – Saudagar as Mandhari
 Saeed Jaffrey – Henna as Khan Baba
 1993 Danny Denzongpa – Khuda Gawah as Khuda Baksh
 Amrish Puri – Muskurahat as Gopichand Verma
 Nana Patekar – Raju Ban Gaya Gentleman as Jai
 1994 Sunny Deol – Damini – Lightning as Govind
 Amrish Puri – Gardish as Purshotam Kashinath Sathe
 Jackie Shroff – Khalnayak as Ram Kumar Sinha
 Nana Patekar – Tirangaa as Shivajirao Wagle
 Naseeruddin Shah – Sir as Amar Verma
 1995 Jackie Shroff – 1942: A Love Story as Shubhankar
 Anupam Kher – Hum Aapke Hain Koun..! as Prof. Siddharth Choudhury
 Mohnish Bahl – Hum Aapke Hain Koun..! as Rajesh Nath
 Saif Ali Khan – Main Khiladi Tu Anari as Deepak Kumar
 Sunil Shetty – Dilwale as Vikram Singh
 1996 Jackie Shroff – Rangeela as Raj Kamal
 Amrish Puri – Dilwale Dulhania Le Jayenge as Baldev Singh Chaudhary
 Anil Kapoor – Trimurti as Anand Singh / Sikander
 Naseeruddin Shah – Naajayaz as Raj Solanki
 Paresh Rawal – Raja as Brijnath 'Birju'
 1997 Amrish Puri – Ghatak: Lethal as Shambhu Nath
Anupam Kher – Chaahat as Shambhunath Singh Rathod
 Jackie Shroff – Agni Sakshi as Suraj Kapoor
 Om Puri – Maachis as Sanatan
 Salman Khan – Jeet as Rajnath 'Raju' Sahay
 1998 Amrish Puri – Virasat as Raja Thakur
Akshaye Khanna – Border as Dharamvir
 Akshay Kumar – Dil To Pagal Hai as Ajay
 Om Puri – Gupt: The Hidden Truth as Inspector Udham Singh
 Sunil Shetty – Border as Bhairav Singh
 1999 Salman Khan – Kuch Kuch Hota Hai as Aman Mehra
 Arbaaz Khan – Pyaar Kiya To Darna Kya as Vishal Thakur
 Manoj Bajpai – Satya as Bhiku Mhatre
 Naseeruddin Shah – China Gate as Maj. Sarfaraz Khan
 Om Puri – Pyaar To Hona Hi Tha as Inspector Khan

2000s

 2002 Akshaye Khanna – Dil Chahta Hai as Siddharth 'Sid' Sinha
 Ajay Devgan – Lajja as Bulwa
 Amitabh Bachchan – Kabhi Khushi Kabhie Gham... as Yashvardhan 'Yash' Raichand
 Hrithik Roshan – Kabhi Khushi Kabhie Gham... as Rohan Y. Raichand
 Jackie Shroff – Yaadein as Raj Singh Puri
 2003 Vivek Oberoi – Company as Chandrakant 'Chandu' Nagre
 Amitabh Bachchan – Aankhen as Vijay Singh Rajput
 Jackie Shroff – Devdas as Chunnilal "Chunnibabu"
 Mohanlal – Company as Srinivasan
 Sanjay Dutt – Kaante as Jay 'Ajju' Rehan
 2004 Saif Ali Khan – Kal Ho Naa Ho as Rohit Patel
 Abhishek Bachchan – Main Prem Ki Diwani Hoon as Prem Kumar
 Arshad Warsi – Munna Bhai M.B.B.S. as Circuit
 Manoj Bajpai – LOC Kargil as Gren. Yogender Singh Yadav
 Salman Khan – Baghban as Alok Raj Malhotra
 2005 Abhishek Bachchan – Yuva as Lallan Singh
 Akshay Kumar – Khakee as Inspector Shekhar Verma
 Akshay Kumar – Mujhse Shaadi Karogi as Sunny Khurana
 Amitabh Bachchan – Veer-Zaara as Chaudhary Sumer Singh
 Zayed Khan – Main Hoon Na as Laxman Prasad Sharma
 2006 Abhishek Bachchan – Sarkar as Shankar Nagre
 Amitabh Bachchan – Bunty Aur Babli as DCP Dashrath Singh
 Arshad Warsi – Salaam Namaste as Ranjan 'Ron' Mathur
 Naseeruddin Shah – Iqbal as Mohit
 Sanjay Dutt – Parineeta as Girish Sharma
 2007 Abhishek Bachchan – Kabhi Alvida Naa Kehna as Rishi Talwar
 Amitabh Bachchan – Kabhi Alvida Naa Kehna as Samarjit 'Sam' Talwar
 John Abraham – Baabul as Rajat Verma
 Kunal Kapoor – Rang De Basanti as Aslam
 Siddharth Narayan – Rang De Basanti as Karan R. Singhania
 2008 Irrfan Khan – Life in a... Metro as Monty
 Aamir Khan – Taare Zameen Par as Ram Shankar Nikumbh
 Anil Kapoor – Welcome as Sagar 'Manju' Pandey
 Mithun Chakraborty – Guru as Manikdas Gupta
 Shreyas Talpade – Om Shanti Om as Pappu Master
 2009 Arjun Rampal – Rock On!! as Joseph 'Joe' Mascarenhas
 Abhishek Bachchan – Sarkar Raj as Shankar Nagre
 Prateik Babbar – Jaane Tu... Ya Jaane Na as Amit Mahant
 Sonu Sood – Jodhaa Akbar as Rajkumar Sujamal
 Tusshar Kapoor – Golmaal Returns as Lucky
 Vinay Pathak – Rab Ne Bana Di Jodi as Balwinder Khosla

2010s

2020s

See also
 Filmfare Awards
 Bollywood
 Cinema of India

References
 Filmfare Awards at Bollywood Hungama

External links
 Official site

Supporting Actor
Film awards for supporting actor